Pleasant Mount or Mount Pleasant is an unincorporated community in Miller County, in the U.S. state of Missouri. The historic community was located along the current Missouri Route FF on a hilltop approximately one-half mile north of the railroad line.

History
Pleasant Mount was platted in 1838. A post office called Pleasant Mount was established in 1847, and remained in operation until 1909. A variant name is "Mount Pleasant".

References

Unincorporated communities in Miller County, Missouri
Unincorporated communities in Missouri